"Ring My Bell" is a 1979 disco song written by Frederick Knight. The song was originally written for then eleven-year-old Stacy Lattisaw, as a teenybopper song about kids talking on the telephone. When Lattisaw signed with a different label, American singer and musician Anita Ward was asked to sing it instead, and it became her only major hit.

"Ring My Bell" went to number one on the Billboard Hot 100 chart, the Disco Top 80 chart and the Soul Singles chart. It also reached number one on the UK Singles Chart. It also garnered Ward a nomination for Best Female R&B Vocal Performance at the 1980 Grammy Awards.

Composition
The song is noted for its innovative use of the Synare electronic drum, playing a decaying high-pitched tom tone on the first beat of every bar. It also uses chimes. The lyrics concern a woman encouraging her partner to relax with her after a hard day at work.

The lyric "You can ring my bell" was seen as sexually suggestive according to 1984 book The Slanguage of Sex, "'You can ring my bell any time you want to' would be regarded as a 'come-on' phrase in the US if used by a female," and "Songs like 'Ring My Bell' by Anita Ward caused scarcely a raised eyebrow in the '70s." Billboard magazine included the song on its list of the 50 sexiest songs of all time. Songwriter Frederick Knight, however, said that he deliberately avoided any overly suggestive lyrics, wanting to project a clean-cut image for Ward.

Charts

Weekly charts

Year-end charts

All-time charts

Certifications

Collette version

"Ring My Bell" was covered by New Zealand-born Australian pop singer Collette. It was released in 1989 as her debut single. The song peaked at number 5 on the ARIA Charts and was certified gold by ARIA.

Track listing
 7" (CBS 654631) 
A. "Ring My Bell" – 3:22
B. "Save Yourself" – 4:06

 12"
A1. "Ring My Bell" (Ring-a-Ling Mix) – 6:12
A2. "Ring My Bell" (Ding-Dong Mix) – 5:41
B1. "Save Yourself" (Survival Mix) – 5:53
B2. "Save Yourself" (Pow Wow Mix) – 6:39

Charts

Weekly charts

Year-end charts

Certification

See also
List of 1970s one-hit wonders in the United States
List of Billboard Hot 100 number-one singles of 1979
List of Cash Box Top 100 number-one singles of 1979
List of European number-one hits of 1979
List of number-one dance singles of 1979 (U.S.)
List of number-one R&B singles of 1979 (U.S.)
List of number-one singles of 1979 (Canada)
List of number-one singles in 1979 (New Zealand)
List of number-one singles of 1979 (Spain)
List of RPM number-one dance singles of 1979
List of UK Singles Chart number ones of the 1970s
VG-lista 1964 to 1994

References

External links

1979 debut singles
1979 songs
1989 debut singles
Anita Ward songs
Billboard Hot 100 number-one singles
Cashbox number-one singles
European Hot 100 Singles number-one singles
Number-one singles in New Zealand
Number-one singles in Norway
Number-one singles in Spain
RPM Top Singles number-one singles
Songs written by Frederick Knight (singer)
UK Singles Chart number-one singles
TK Records singles
CBS Records singles